Zenodotus (fl. late 5th century) was a Neoplatonist philosopher who lived and taught in Athens. He was described as "the darling (paidika) of Proclus." Zenodotus served under Marinus of Neapolis when Marinus succeeded Proclus as the head (scholarch) of the school (c. 485). He was a teacher of Damascius when he came to Athens to learn philosophy (c. 492). Whereas Marinus taught mathematics and scientific courses to Damascius, Zenodotus taught the more conventional philosophy courses. He was an important philosopher in Athens during the time when Marinus and Hegias were contending for the leadership of the school, but he seems to have been overlooked as a possible scholarch on more than one occasion.

Notes

References
Edward Jay Watts (2006), City and School in Late Antique Athens and Alexandria. University of California Press. pp. 116–123.

5th-century philosophers
Neoplatonists
Ancient Roman philosophers
5th-century Byzantine people